Vimalbhai Kanabhai Chudasama is an Indian politician and member of the Gujarat Legislative Assembly from Somnath representing the Indian National Congress party. He is a first time MLA and belong to the Koli caste of Gujarat.

References 

1980 births
Living people
Indian politicians
People from Gujarat